Devatha is a 1982 Indian Telugu-language film directed by K. Raghavendra Rao, starring Sobhan Babu, Sridevi, Jaya Prada and Mohan Babu. The film was produced by D. Rama Naidu on Suresh Productions banner. The film is about two sisters and their love triangle with a man. K. Raghavendra Rao remade the film in Hindi as Tohfa (1984), with both Sridevi and Jaya Prada reprising their roles. It was also remade in Tamil as Deiva Piravi (1985).

Cast 
 Sobhan Babu as Rambabu
 Sridevi as Lalitha
 Jaya Prada as Janaki
 Mohan Babu as Kamesam
 Rao Gopal Rao as Narasayya
 Nirmalamma
 Rama Prabha

Production 
The story drew inspiration from the 1959 Tamil film Kalyana Parisu, directed by C. V. Sridhar, who also directed its Hindi remake, Nazrana, (1961) starring Raj Kapoor and Vyjayanthimala and the 1960 Telugu movie Pelli Kanuka. The dialogues were written by Satyanand.

Music 
K. Chakravarthy composed the film's music. The song "Elluvachi Godaramma" was remixed for the movie Gaddalakonda Ganesh as "Elluvochi Godaramma".

References

External links 
 

1980s Telugu-language films
1982 films
Films directed by K. Raghavendra Rao
Films scored by K. Chakravarthy
Indian drama films
Suresh Productions films
Telugu films remade in other languages